Graham Usher (1938–1975) was a ballet dancer with the Royal Ballet.

Usher appeared as a castaway on the BBC Radio programme Desert Island Discs on 16 May 1970.

He was forced to retire early in 1970 due to fainting fits. He died suddenly at the age of 36 in February 1975.

Jeffery Taylor subsequently described him as:

References

External links 

 
 BFI listing

1938 births
Place of birth missing
1975 deaths
Place of death missing
British male ballet dancers
Dancers of The Royal Ballet